Vigors (1973–1994) was an American Thoroughbred racehorse known as "The White Tornado." Called by Bloodhorse.com in a 2011 article "the great California closer," Vigors earned the affection of racing fans because of his dramatic come-from-behind running style.

Background
Vigors was bred in Kentucky by William R. Hawn, a Dallas, Texas businessman who was the president and a shareholder of Del Mar Racetrack in Del Mar, California, and a founding partner of the Dallas Cowboys of the National Football League. The horse was named for William Hawn's friend Tim Vigors, a World War II fighter ace and founder of Ireland's renowned Coolmore Stud.

Racing career
Raced mainly on grass, in 1977 the late developing Vigors won the Hollywood Invitational Handicap and the Rolling Green Handicap. The following year, trainer Larry Sterling entered him in the San Marcos Handicap, a race of a mile and an eighth on dirt. Under jockey Darrel McHargue, Vigors won easily then with the same rider followed up with a win in the San Antonio Stakes in track record time on dirt. In the most important win of his career, Darrel McHargue brought Vigors from dead last to win the Santa Anita Handicap by two lengths, again on dirt. For jockey McHargue, the win topped off an extraordinary day in which he won six races. Vigors did not race again until early June when he won the Bel Air Handicap on dirt. Assigned top weight in the Hollywood Gold Cup, Vigors ran third in what was his final race before retiring to stud duty.

Stud career
Vigors stood at Jonabell Farm, near Lexington Kentucky. He was the successful sire of numerous winners including multiple stakes winners, Royal Mountain Inn, Exemplary Leader and Lovlier Linda, among others. He also sired millionaires Hodges Bay and Real Connection and had five other of his progeny earn more than half a million dollars in racing. Vigors is also the damsire of Ginger Gold, the 2001 Canadian Champion Two-Year-Old Filly.

Vigors died at age twenty-three on September 27, 1994 due to health problems.

Pedigree

References

External links
 YouTube video of Vigors, the "White Tornado", winning the 1978 Santa Anita Handicap  
 Vigors' pedigree

1973 racehorse births
1994 racehorse deaths
Racehorses bred in Kentucky
Racehorses trained in the United States
Horse racing track record setters
Thoroughbred family 32